Jeno's Pizza is a pizzeria chain based in Colombia. It was acquired by Telepizza in 2010.

History

Jeno's Pizza was established on 1 October 1973 in Bogotá. A second location opened in 1976. The original restaurants catered to children and families. They later created Jeno's Club on December 11, 1992, which are locations with play areas for children.

In June 2010 the chain was acquired by the multinational Telepizza, adding to their more than 900 restaurants worldwide. By December 2010, the company completed the refurbishment of 15 of its 80 outlets continuing this work in 2011 to modernize its existing infrastructure. Jeno's Pizza additionally implemented an expansion plan for 2011, planning to open 30 new locations for a total of 110 outlets. The opening of new locations of Jeno's Pizza were held in Bogota, Cali, Medellin, Barranquilla, Cartagena, and Bucaramanga. Pereira, Manizales and Armenia added Jeno's Pizza locations in 2011.

References

External links
Jeno's Pizza

Restaurants established in 1973
Food and drink companies of Colombia
Pizza chains
Colombian companies established in 1973
Food and drink companies established in 1973